Marlborough School is an independent college-preparatory secondary school for grades 7 through 12 at 250 South Rossmore Avenue in the Hancock Park neighborhood of Los Angeles, California. Marlborough was founded in 1889 by New England educator Mary Caswell and is the oldest independent girls' school in Southern California. In 2016, Town & Country magazine ranked Marlborough as the "best girls' school in America."

History
Mary S. Caswell, a young teacher from Maine, founded Marlborough in 1889 as St. Margaret's School for Girls. In 1890, the school adopted the name Marlborough and moved from Pasadena to the rapidly growing city of Los Angeles. Caswell led the school until 1924, when Ada Blake (recruited from Louisville Collegiate School) assumed its leadership. Blake expanded the curriculum substantially and the School gained a reputation for providing young women with an uncommonly rigorous education.

By the 1960s, the School was supported by a healthy foundation and an active board of trustees, who hired  William Pereira and Associates to design new buildings. The Los Angeles business community actively supported the school in the latter half of the 20th century, with local titans including Robert H. Ahmanson and Charlie Munger giving generously.

In 2014, a sexual misconduct investigation resulted in the imprisonment of a former teacher.

In 2015, Dr. Priscilla Sands was named head of school. Sands came to Marlborough after a career at the Agnes Irwin School and the Springside Chestnut Hill Academy, both independent schools in the Philadelphia area. In 2022, Jennifer Ciccarelli became the head of school after serving in the same role at the Columbus School for Girls in Columbus, Ohio.

Academics
The student-to-teacher ratio at Marlborough School is approximately 8:1, lower than the national high school average of 11:1 and the public school average of 16:1. This ratio enables Marlborough to offer over 156 courses. Over 80% of faculty members have more than ten years of teaching experience and almost 90% have advanced degrees. In recent years, the most popular postgraduate destinations for Marlborough women include a mix of elite private and "public ivy" institutions.

Marlborough ranked sixth in the nation among high schools with the highest standardized test scores according to Business Insider.

Recent guest speakers at Marlborough include Queen Rania of Jordan, former Secretary of State Madeleine Albright, Pulitzer Prize-winning New York Times columnist Nicholas Kristof, historian Edward L. Ayers, Nobel Prize Laureate Leymah Gbowee, and producer/actor Mindy Kaling.

Notable alumnae
  Carolin Babcock  tennis player
  Katherine Bashford  landscape architect
  Camilla Belle  film and television actress
  Betsy Bloomingdale  philanthropist and fashion icon
  Cornelia Butler  museum curator (currently Chief Curator at the Hammer Museum)
  Joan Riddell Cook  newspaper journalist and editor, trade union leader, and a founding director of JAWS (Journalism and Women Symposium)
  Jacqueline Emerson  actress and singer
  Sabaah Folayan  award-winning documentary filmmaker
 Olivia Jade Giannulli and Bella Giannulli (transferred after 9th and 10th grade)
  Suzanne Goin  chef and restaurateur
  Kate Grace  Olympic finalist in the women's 800m
  Dolly Green  philanthropist and thoroughbred owner 
  Leila Holterhoff  singer, linguist, psychoanalyst
  Marian Osgood Hooker  physician and photographer
  Caroline Howard Hume  art collector and philanthropist
  Lois January  film actress 
  Marion Jorgensen  philanthropist and civic leader
  Zoe Kazan  actress and playwright
  Jessica Levinson  law professor and political commentator
  Diane Disney Miller  author, philanthropist, and vintner, daughter of Walt Disney 
  Peggy Moffitt  model and actress (famous for associations with Rudi Gernreich)
  The daughters of President Richard Nixon (Tricia Nixon Cox and Julie Nixon Eisenhower) briefly attended in the early 1960s
  Abi Olajuwon  WNBA player and college basketball coach
  Melissa Rivers  actress, television host and producer (attended but transferred for tenth grade)
  Sasha Spielberg  actress and musician, daughter of Steven Spielberg
  Alex Witt  MSNBC news anchor
  Stephanie Zimbalist  actress (did not graduate)
Leigh Bardugo  young adult and fantasy author
Eden McCoy   actress

Notable faculty and staff
  Josh Deu  musician and songwriter, co-founding member of indie rock band Arcade Fire 
Gertrude Gogin  former YWCA national secretary for girls' programs, joined the Marlborough faculty in 1938
  George Toley  tennis coach (later at University of Southern California)

Pop culture mentions
Marlborough recently has been mentioned in the shows Ray Donovan and Red Band Society.

References

External links
 
 Official Marlborough School newspaper

Preparatory schools in California
Educational institutions established in 1889
High schools in Los Angeles
Girls' schools in California
Private high schools in California
Private middle schools in California
Hancock Park, Los Angeles
1889 establishments in California